The 1995 Roller Hockey World Cup was the thirty-second roller hockey world cup, organized by the Fédération Internationale de Roller Sports. It was contested by 12 national teams (8 from Europe, 3 from South America and 1 from Africa). The tournament was played in the city of Recife, in Brazil.

Group stage

Group A

Group B

Final phase

9th to 12th play-off

Final round

Standings

See also
 FIRS Roller Hockey World Cup

External links
 1995 World Cup in rink-hockey.net historical database

Roller Hockey World Cup
International roller hockey competitions hosted by Brazil
1995 in roller hockey
1995 in Brazilian sport